People with the German surname von der Groeben include:

 Alexander von der Groeben (born 1955), former athlete and journalist
 Friedrich von der Groeben (1645–1712), Officer
 Hans von der Groeben (1907–2005), diplomat 
 Karl von der Gröben (1788–1876), general
 Otto Friedrich von der Groeben (1657–1728), general 
 Ulrike von der Groeben (born 1957), journalist

German-language surnames